A Mii is a personalized digital avatar on Nintendo video game consoles.

Mii or MII may also refer to:
 1002, the year or the number, in Roman numerals
 Mii (Jungle de Ikou!), the goddess of fertility in Jungle de Ikou!
 MII (videocassette format), a video tape format developed by Panasonic
 Maritime Institute of Ireland
 Media-independent interface, in Ethernet hardware
 Mineral Information Institute, an American educational institute
 Mutual Information Index, a measure of two random variables' mutual dependence
 Frank Miloye Milenkowichi Airport in Marília, Brazil (IATA code)
 SEAT Mii, a small car by SEAT
 MII, cost estimating software developed for the United States Army Corps of Engineers by Project Time & Cost
 Major Industry Identifier, part of ISO/IEC 7812
 Medium Independent Interface, in the ITU-T G.hn standard for high-speed networking over home wires
 Ministry of Information Industry of the People's Republic of China, precursor to the Ministry of Industry and Information Technology of the People's Republic of China

See also

 
 
 Model 2 (disambiguation)
 MIIS (disambiguation)
 MI (disambiguation)
 M2 (disambiguation)